Milesia spectabilis is a species of hoverfly in the family Syrphidae.

Distribution
Oriental, exact locality unknown.

References

Insects described in 1990
Eristalinae
Diptera of Asia